Diastrophus rubi is a species of gall wasp in the family Cynipidae that live on the stems of bramble (Rubus species). The insect was first described by the German entomologist Peter Friedrich Bouché in 1834 and is found in Europe.

Description

Gall
Some herbivorous insects create their own microhabitats by forming an abnormal growth, in this case a gall. Both upright and prostrate stems can be galled and they are often low down and hidden by vegetation. They tend to be most noticeable in the winter when brambles have lost some of their foliage. The gall is an elongate swelling in the stems of brambles; 2–15 cm long and circa 1 cm wide. They are often curved or they cause the stem to bend and can contain up to 200 spherical swellings. Each swelling is a chamber containing a white wasp larva. Larvae overwinter in the gall and adults emerge the following spring. Galls can remain on the plants for many years, are often silvery and numerous exit holes can be seen.

Galls have been recorded on the following brambles:- 

 Rubus caesius – European dewberry 
 Rubus fruticosus – bramble
 Rubus gillotii
 Rubus idaeus – red raspberry 
 Rubus praecox
 Rubus seebergensis
  Rubus sulcatus
 Rubus ulmifolius – elmleaf blackberry

Distribution
Diastrophus rubi has been found in the following countries; Austria, Denmark, France, Germany, Great Britain (most common in the south and east), Hungary, Spain and Sweden.

References

Cynipidae
Gall-inducing insects
Hymenoptera of Europe
Insects described in 1834
Taxa named by Peter Friedrich Bouché